The Lazarus Project may refer to the following:

 The Lazarus Project (film), 2008 American drama/thriller film
 The Lazarus Project (novel), 2008 historical novel
 The Lazarus Project (TV series), 2022 science fiction series

See also
 Project Lazarus, 2003 Doctor Who audio drama